The 2009–10 NC State Wolfpack men's basketball team represented NC State University in the 2009–10 men's college basketball season. The team was coached by Sidney Lowe and played its home games at the RBC Center in Raleigh, NC. The Wolfpack is a member of the Atlantic Coast Conference. The 2009–10 season marked the 100th season of Wolfpack men's basketball. NC State finished the season 20–16 (5–11 in ACC play). The team advanced to the quarterfinals of the 2010 ACC men's basketball tournament before losing to Georgia Tech. They were invited to the 2010 National Invitation Tournament and advanced to the second round before being defeated by UAB.

2009–10 Roster

2009–10 Schedule

|-
!colspan=9| Exhibition

|-
!colspan=9| Regular Season

|-
!colspan=9| ACC tournament

|-
!colspan=9| National Invitation Tournament

References

Nc State
NC State Wolfpack men's basketball seasons
Nc State
2009 in sports in North Carolina
2010 in sports in North Carolina